Wolfgang Stampfer (born May 3, 1972) is an Austrian bobsledder who has competed since 1993. Competing in three Winter Olympics, he earned his best finish of seventh in the two-man event at Salt Lake City in 2002.

Stampfer's best finish at the FIBT World Championships was sixth in the two-man event at St. Moritz in 2007.

References
Austrian Olympic Committee profile prior to the 2002 Winter Olympics 

Sports-Reference.com profile

1972 births
Austrian male bobsledders
Bobsledders at the 2002 Winter Olympics
Bobsledders at the 2006 Winter Olympics
Bobsledders at the 2010 Winter Olympics
Living people
Olympic bobsledders of Austria